Slip sheets are thin, pallet-sized sheets made of plastic, heavy laminated kraft paperboard, or corrugated fiberboard and are used in commercial shipping, replacing traditional wooden pallets.  The unit load is usually stretch wrapped or shrink wrapped for stability.

Description
The slip sheet is used as a pallet support device in vehicle delivery and transportation of products. When slip sheets are supported by a pallet board, flat load carrying surface, or a cart or fork lift truck, the structural strength of the slip sheet supports the product load's weight. With the slip sheet supported by one of these transportation devices the unit load can easily be transported both internally within a facility and externally between two facility locations. It helps to decrease the human intervention in order to provide safety and efficiency of the work.

Types
There are several types of slip sheets that can be used for the transportation of a unit load depending upon the desired use of the sheet. The slip sheet is shaped and dimensioned to the size of the product or unit load. The type of slip sheet varies depending on both the number of lip extensions and the material from which it is manufactured.

The variation used would depend on the loading patterns, unit load parameters, and desired maneuverability of the slip sheet/unit load.

The slip sheet has a four to six inch lip (tab) that extends beyond one or more of the sides of the slip sheet. The lip extensions permit a push-pull device to lift the slip sheet unit load.

Single lip
The first type of slip sheet is the single lip (tab) slip sheet.

With a single lip, the lip faces the narrow part of the rectangular shaped unit load and the delivery truck door. This slip sheet variation maximizes the delivery truck’s space utilization and loading and unloading process productivity. Also, with a single lip, the travel path clearance is minimized as the lip faces the unit load carrier.

Multi-lip
The second type of slip sheet is the multi-lip slip sheet. This type of slip sheet is generally used on a container placed onto a railroad car or an ocean delivery vehicle due to the necessary loading/unloading patterns.

See also
 Packaging and labeling
 Pallet inverter

References

Further reading
 Yam, K.L., "Encyclopedia of Packaging Technology", John Wiley & Sons, 2009, 
 Fiedler, R. M, Distribution Packaging Technology, Institute of Packaging Professionals, 1995, 
 McKinlay, A. H., Transport Packaging, 2nd ed., Institute of Packaging Professionals, 2004, 
 MHIA/ANSI MH1–2005 Pallets, Slip Sheets, and Other Bases for Unit Loads
 Kay, M.G., 2012, Material Handling Equipment, Retrieved 2014-10-02.

Freight transport
Material handling
Material-handling equipment
Packaging